Narzole is a comune (municipality) in the Province of Cuneo in the Italian region Piedmont, located about  south of Turin and about  northeast of Cuneo.

Narzole borders the following municipalities: Barolo, Bene Vagienna, Cherasco, La Morra, Lequio Tanaro, Novello, and Salmour.

Twin towns — sister cities
Narzole is twinned with:

  Tende, France, since 1992

References 

Cities and towns in Piedmont